South Sutton is an unincorporated community in the town of Sutton in Merrimack County, New Hampshire, United States. It is located along New Hampshire Route 114, which leads north through Sutton Mills and North Sutton into the town of New London, and south into the town of Bradford. South Sutton is located along the Lane River.

South Sutton has a separate ZIP code (03273) from other parts of the town of Sutton.

Notable person
Kitty DeGree, real estate developer and philanthropist in Monroe, Louisiana, born in South Sutton in 1922

References

Unincorporated communities in Merrimack County, New Hampshire
Unincorporated communities in New Hampshire
Sutton, New Hampshire